Bradshaw F.C. was an English association football club from the village of Bradshaw Brow, near Bolton in Lancashire.

History
The club was founded in 1878.  It was an early member of the Lancashire Football Association, entering the Lancashire Senior Cup for the first time in 1880-81, the second year of the competition's existence, but losing 9-0 to Blackburn Rovers in the first round.

FA Cup

The club entered the FA Cup for the first time in 1883-84, losing in the first round to the newly-founded Bolton Association F.C.  The following year the club was unlucky to draw Darwen for their first tie; the Darreners were not the force they had been half-a-decade earlier, but they were still professional, and Bradshaw went down 11-0.  Darwen were so dominant that goalkeeper Richmond went up front during the second half and scored two goals.

Bradshaw's third and final FA Cup appearance was the club's most competitive, being drawn against Hurst in the first round.  Bradshaw lost 2-1, but protested that the Hurst player Nussey was registered with Astley Bridge, and a regional committee in Liverpool ordered a replay.  That replay ended 1-1, and, as Hurst refused to play extra-time, referee Downs awarded the tie to Bradshaw.  Unfortunately for the village side, Hurst protested this decision, and the Football Association ordered another replay, this time at a neutral venue.  At the third time of asking, in Darwen, Hurst finally beat Bradshaw 3-2, with Bradshaw nearly coming back from 3-0 down at half-time.  Both sides played the first half with ten men after a Hurst player missed his train and a Bradshaw player did not turn up; in the second half both sides were up to eleven, Bradshaw pressing a reserve player into service.

Although the club did not enter the competition again, it remained active as a club until at least 1888.

Colours

The club's colours were white and blue.

References

Defunct football clubs in England
Defunct football clubs in Lancashire
Association football clubs established in 1878
Association football clubs disestablished in the 19th century